Vtáčkovce is a village and municipality in Košice-okolie District in the Kosice Region of eastern Slovakia.

History
In historical records the village was first mentioned in 1427.

Geography
The village lies at an altitude of 400 metres and covers an area of 3.25 km².
It has a population of over 800 people with almost 100 new inhabitants since December 2004.

External links

Villages and municipalities in Košice-okolie District
Šariš